Hexabranchus morsomus, also known as the "Caribbean Spanish Dancer", is a species of sea slug, a marine mollusc in the family Hexabranchidae.

Distribution
It occurs in the Caribbean Sea including waters around St. Kitts and the Netherlands Antilles, and has also been identified in Honduras, Panama, Costa Rica, Venezuela, St. Lucia, Martinique, Antigua, Grenada, St. Vincent & the Grenadines, Trinidad & Tobago, Aruba, Puerto Rico, Virgin Islands, Sint Maarten.

Description
Body is oval to elongate. Dorsum is small with conical tubercles. Rhinophores are club shaped. Gill is large, composed of several multi-pinnated leaves. Background color is reddish with mottled white and yellow patches on the dorsum. Mantle margin usually curled up over small portion of dorsum covering white areas. It is up to 400 mm long.

Ecology
It is found under rocks or coral rubble, primarily on living reefs. Minimum recorded depth is 0 m. Maximum recorded depth is 33 m. Defensive behavior consists of the unrolling of the mantle margins to expose bright white areas followed by swimming by contracting the body and mantle margin. Species of the genus Hexabranchus prey on a variety of sponges.

Further reading
 Valdés Á. (2002) "How many species of Hexabranchus (Opisthobranchia : Dorididae) are there?" Molluscan Research 22(3): 289-301. PDF.

References
This article incorporates Creative Commons (CC-BY-4.0) text from the reference

External links 
 Hexabranchus morsomus at nudipixel

Hexabranchidae
Gastropods described in 1962